James Nicholas Farmer (born 1976, Birmingham, UK) is founder and CEO of Incsub, which includes the WordPress related companies of WPMU DEV, WPMU.org, and Edublogs.org, the largest global weblog community for educators. Farmer is currently based in Australia, where he has been the Online Community Editor of The Age, and Lecturer in Education Design at Deakin University. Farmer's blog, "Incorporated Subversion," has been a resource for educators involved with social media and online publishing since 2003.

Edublogs.org hosts over 4.38 million separate weblogs, used by educators and students around the world.

Farmer is founder of The Edublog Awards, a series of educational weblog awards which have been run every year since 2004. The awards are now co-facilitated by James Farmer and Josie Fraser.

Farmer was one of the 3 organisers of BlogTalk Downunder, the first blogging conference in Australia. He also organized and ran the first WordCamp in Australia, WordCamp Melbourne

He has recently been quoted in The Herald Sun newspaper and on news.com.au regarding allegations of inappropriate advertising on Edublogs.org

March 2011 - Incsub LLC CEO James Farmer accused of copy-write infringement.

Presentations 
 Speaker at BlogTalk DownUnder, "Centred Communication: Weblogs and aggregation in the organisation"
 Keynote speaker at ICTEV 2007
 Keynote speaker at efest 2008

Publications 
 Communication dynamics: Discussion boards, weblogs and the development of communities of inquiry in online learning environments
 Blogs @ Anywhere: High fidelity online communication
 Centred communication - Weblogs and aggregation in the organisation

References

1976 births
People from Birmingham, West Midlands
Living people
English chief executives
English company founders
English bloggers
Date of birth missing (living people)
British male bloggers